The fourth-generation Honda Integra (chassis code DC5), produced by Honda, was introduced in Japan on 13 April 2001, and produced from July 2001 until August 2006. It was introduced in North America on 2 July 2001 as the Acura RSX, the name a part of Acura's naming scheme changing the names of its models from recognizable names like "Integra" or "Legend" to alphabetical designations in order for buyers to build more recognition to the marque, and not the individual cars.

Chassis and drivetrain 
In concordance with the introduction of the Integra's platform mate, the seventh-generation Civic being introduced in 2000, the Integra joined the Civic in abandoning Honda's traditional double wishbone suspension at both ends and adopted MacPherson struts in the front and trailing arm type suspension in the rear along with the new K-series engine supplanting the B-series.

The K-series engine features intelligent VTEC (or i-VTEC), which electronically adjusts valve lift, valve duration and valve timing, giving the 2.0 L engine a flatter torque curve relative to previous VTEC implementations which only adjusted valve lift and valve duration.

Facelift 
The Integra received a facelift in 2004 (MY2005). The headlight and taillight assemblies lost the "half circle" on the bottom. This made the assemblies flush with the bumpers. The interior received new trim and gauge clusters, an immobilizer and alarm became standard, the body became stiffer, the suspension springs were redesigned, and the car's tendency to bump steer was reduced.

Markets

Japan 
In Japan, the Integra was introduced in two versions, the iS (later renamed Type S in the 2004 refresh) and the Type R.

The 2001-2003 iS was available with 15-inch steel wheels with covers, or optional 16-inch 5-spoke alloy wheels. The 2004-2006 Type S was equipped with 17-inch 5-spoke alloy wheels shared with the RSX Type-S. The JDM Type R had reduced weight, a 2.0L DOHC i-VTEC 4-cylinder K20A engine that output 217 hp (164 kw)  (Japan-only; Oceania models use an engine similar to the RSX Type-S), 6-speed close-ratio manual transmission, as well as a helical limited slip differential (LSD), stiffer springs and shocks, high intensity discharge (HID) projector headlights, aluminum pedal set, 4-piston front Brembo brake calipers, 17-inch 5 double-spoke wheels on Bridgestone Potenza tires, Recaro suede seats/matching interior, leather wrapped MOMO steering wheel, body trim, front strut bar, and more. The Type R lacked many of the luxury features (like vanity mirrors or side airbags) found in the Type S, true to its racing heritage. The C package on the Type R added various accessories, such as a rear wiper, remote control, and folding mirrors. The JDM iS had one interior color, Ebony, in its first year. After 2002, Titanium interiors became available for all exterior colors. The Type S had redesigned cloth and leather seats. The Type R had choices of black/blue/red interiors (including color matching Recaro seats), depending on exterior colors. The refreshed Type R had the option of either the high wing, or the trunk lip spoiler. Both the iS and Type S were available with sunroof, and navigation systems. Additional interior and exterior accessories were available from Honda's Modulo line. Modulo accessories offered include interior trim (shift knobs, decals, etc.), foglights, aero kits (front/side/rear bumper enhancements), wing spoilers, alloy wheels, push button start, upgraded speakers, and navigation.

Japan's vehicle parts road compliance regulations means many tuning parts for the Integra can be purchased from Honda dealerships. For example, M&M Honda, a Honda dealer, manages their own brand of parts. Honda tuner Mugen sells their performance parts via Honda dealers as accessories.

Oceania 
In Australia, the Integra was available in four models: the base model, simply named Integra, Luxury, Type R and Type S. The base Integra was simply the Japanese-market iS, while the Luxury added accessories like leather seats and a sunroof. Australian Type Rs were different from the JDM models, as they were not equipped with all of the features of the latter. They lacked the Brembo braking system, used the 200 hp K20A2 in place of the slightly more powerful K20A, and regular 16-inch 5-spoke wheels, painted in gun metal or white, were used instead of the 17-inch, 5 dual-spokes. However, the Australian Type R does retain the JDM model's helical limited slip differential, and full Type R interior (MOMO steering wheel, aluminum pedals and shift knob, Recaro seats and color matched carpets) and aero (wing and front/rear bumper lips). The Type R was dropped in 2004, and replaced by the Type S, which was mechanically identical to the USDM RSX Type-S (though it did lack cruise control), but badged like the JDM Type S. With the Integra's refresh in 2004, the base model was dropped. The only trims available in 2006 was the Luxury and Type S. Black was the only interior color available for the redesign. For facelifted Oceanic models, extra strengthening was given to fit higher safety regulations.

New Zealand only had two models, the VTi and Type R. The VTi came standard with alloy wheels, but was otherwise the same as the JDM iS. The Type R was also replaced by the Type-S like Australia in 2004. NZDM Type R models are the same as AUDM ones, but did not have ABS.

United States 

In the US, the Acura RSX was available in two models: the base model, simply named RSX and the Type-S. The RSX came standard with numerous features, such as cruise control, 4-wheel disc brakes with ABS, power windows and a power moonroof. The RSX came with the  2.0L DOHC i-VTEC 4-cylinder K20A3 engine throughout the entire production run.
Sport cloth seats were standard with optional perforated leather interior. Also available were optional 16-inch 7-spoke alloy wheels, which were very similar to those of the USDM DC2 Integra Type R (only 1 inch larger). The base model RSX was available with either a 5-speed manual or a 5-speed automatic transmission with Sequential SportShift and Grade Logic Control.

From 2002-2004, the Type-S was equipped with a  2.0L DOHC i-VTEC 4-cylinder K20A2 engine. Beginning in 2005, the engine was replaced with a more powerful  2.0L DOHC i-VTEC 4-cylinder K20Z1 engine

The Type-S was only available with a close-ratio 6-speed manual. The Type-S included additional features such as sport-tuned suspension, gunmetal painted wheels, 11.8-inch ventilated front disc brakes, larger sway bars and a Bose 7-speaker (including a subwoofer mounted on the spare tire) audio system with a 6-disc in-dash CD changer.

One peculiar note for the initial 2002 model year were two available options. HID projector headlights from the Integra Type R was made available to the RSX for $1500.

In 2005, the RSX and RSX Type-S received a styling refresh. On the exterior, the headlights and taillights were updated while the Type-S received an updated rear hatch spoiler. The base model received 12-spoke Enkei alloy wheels, while the Type-S came with 17-inch 5-spoke Enkei/Asahi wheels wrapped in Michelin HX MXM4 215/45/R17 tires. 17-inch Enkei J10s alloy wheels (with Acura specific fitment and center caps) were optional. The Type-S received a higher output engine which included the camshafts, b-pipe and muffler, 4.77 final drive ratio, crankshaft pulley and the intake snorkel duct from the Japanese Type R.

The "A-Spec Performance Package" was a dealer option package. The body kit is essentially a debadged JDM Honda Modulo kit, while the wing is from the Type R. The package included a sport suspension system, under-body spoiler kit, wing spoiler (with stronger hatch shocks to hold additional weight), exterior badging and 5 dual-spoke 17-inch gun metal wheels.

The RSX had numerous exterior color options but only two interior colors: Black (Ebony) and Beige (Titanium). The exterior color choice would dictate the interior color.  Some colors were available in either trim package while other colors would be available in one trim level but not the other.

In 2002, color options were as follows:

In 2006, the available color combinations were as follows:

Canada 
Three models were available in Canada:  Base, Premium and Type-S.  The base model came equipped with a cloth interior, no sunroof, unpainted side skirts and front lip and 15-inch steel wheels with wheel covers and lacked cruise control and ABS braking.  The Premium model added a moonroof, 16-inch alloy wheels and heated leather seats. The Type-S came equipped with a 200-210 hp (depending on the model year) 2.0L DOHC i-VTEC 4-cylinder engine, larger front brakes, a BOSE sound system with a spare tire mounted subwoofer, stiffer suspension, an oil cooler and an upper strut tower bar. The A-Spec package was available to the Type-S models. All Canadian cars with leather seats were heated along with side view mirrors.

The refresh in 2005 brought the same updates as USDM cars. The base model now has standard alloy wheels (16-inch, 12-spoke). Sport cloth seats are standard in 2005, optional leather in 2005-2006.

Wheel types varied according to model year. 2002-2004 models had a 15-inch steel wheel with covers (Base), 16-inch 5-spoke alloy wheels in silver (Premium) or gunmetal (Type-S). 2005-2006 had 12-spoke wheels for both Base and Premium. Type-S had the 17-inch 5-spoke alloy wheels. Acura branded Enkei J10s, 16-inch old ITR, and 17-inch 5-dual spoke A-Specs were available as accessory wheels.

The CDM RSX had the same interior as the USDM RSX, however the exterior and interior colours are different. e.g. CDM Taffeta/Premium White Pearl exterior cars came with Ebony black interiors.

Safety 
The National Highway Traffic Safety Administration (NHTSA) has determined crash test ratings of the RSX.

Performance 
 0-60 mph: 6.3 sec (2002-04 Type-S)
 0-60 mph: 6.2 sec (2005-06 Type-S)
 Top speed : (drag limited) 
 Standing 1/4-mile: 15.8 sec(2002-06 Base)
 Standing 1/4-mile: 15.1 sec(2002-04 Type-S)
 Standing 1/4-mile: 14.6 sec(2005-06 Type-S) @ 95 mph
 70 mph-0 mph braking distance : 
  skidpad : 0.86 g
 EPA Fuel Economy:  city/ highway

Awards 
The RSX was named in Car and Driver's 10 Best List in 2002 and 2003.

Racing 
Acura won the Manufacturers' Championship of the SCCA World Challenge Touring Car class in 2006, running both RSXs and TSXs. RSX drivers finished in 5th and 9th in the Drivers' Championship.
Kensai Racing used RSXs and TSXs in the KONI Challenge Series.
Badged as a Honda, the DC5 won the British Touring Car Championship with Matt Neal in 2005 and 2006, for Team Dynamics (branded as Team Halfords after the title sponsor). When competing a K24 engine swap from an Acura TSX or installing a supercharger/turbocharger is done by many.

Sales

Notes

References 

Integra (fourth generation)
Cars introduced in 2002
Cars discontinued in 2006
Compact cars
Hatchbacks
Front-wheel-drive vehicles

pl:Honda Integra#Honda Integra IV